Gérard Poulain (1 August 1936 – 24 January 2019) was a French field hockey player. He competed in the men's tournament at the 1960 Summer Olympics.

References

External links
 

1936 births
2019 deaths
French male field hockey players
Olympic field hockey players of France
Field hockey players at the 1960 Summer Olympics
Sportspeople from Amiens